Tine Debeljak (27 April 1903 – 20 January 1989) was a Slovenian literary critic, translator, editor, and poet. Debeljak was born in Škofja Loka. He graduated in 1927 from the University of Ljubljana, where he studied Slavic and comparative literature. In 1948 he emigrated to Argentina.

Works
He translated other works from Czech, Polish, Russian, Hungarian, and Italian into Slovenian. He was the author of hundreds of articles on literature as well as several books.

References

External links

1903 births
1989 deaths
People from Škofja Loka
University of Ljubljana alumni
Slovenian translators
Slovenian literary critics
Slovenian editors
Slovenian poets
Slovenian male poets
Slovenian emigrants to Argentina
20th-century translators
20th-century poets